"Du bist wie ich" (English: You Are Like Me) is a song by German recording artist Jessica Wahls. It was written by Diane Weigmann and Till Brönner and produced by the latter along with duo Schumann & Bach. Wahls's first German language record, it served as the theme song for the show KiKA LIVE on the KiKa network and was released as the third solo single in March 2005.

Track listings

Personnel and credits 
Credits adapted from the liner notes of "Du bist wie ich."

 Till Brönner – writing, production
 Schumann & Bach – production

 Jessica Wahls – backing vocals, lead vocals
 Diane Weigmann – writing

Charts

References

2005 songs
Polydor Records singles